The Outlaw Deputy is a 1935 American Western film, directed by Otto Brower. It stars Tim McCoy, Nora Lane, and Hooper Atchley.

References

External links
The Outlaw Deputy at the Internet Movie Database

1935 films
American Western (genre) films
1935 Western (genre) films
Films directed by Otto Brower
American black-and-white films
1930s American films